Frédéric Marie Joseph Bruno de Laparre de Saint-Sernin is a French politician and businessman, born 14 February 1958 in Reims.

He was the representative of former French Co-Prince Jacques Chirac in Andorra until 2002. He was also an adviser to the French President between 1999 and 2006.

He has twice been elected to the French Parliament, representing Dordogne for the right-wing political party Union pour un Mouvement Populaire (1993–1997 and 2002–2004).

He was secretary of state (French minor minister) for spatial planning from 2004 to 2005. Since 4 December 2006, he has been chair of the football team Stade Rennais.

References 

1958 births
Living people
Politicians from Reims
Union for a Popular Movement politicians
Deputies of the 12th National Assembly of the French Fifth Republic
French football chairmen and investors
Chevaliers of the Légion d'honneur
Business people from Reims